Khaled Muhammad Samy Abol Naga (born November 2, 1966), credited as Khaled Abol Naga and by the mononym Kal Naga, is an Egyptian actor, director and producer. He is recognized primarily for his work in Egypt and the Middle East, but has increasingly ventured into American and British film and television roles. He started acting and directing (English and Arabic language) plays and musicals in Egypt while studying theatre at The American University in Cairo. Beginning his professional acting career in 2000, Naga starred in several movies through the next decade with roles encompassing several genres, from musicals None but that! (2007), action Agamista (2007), Eyes Of A Thief (2014), thrillers Kashf Hesab (2007), art-house Heliopolis (2009), Villa 69 (2013), Decor (2014), and slapstick comedy Habibi Naêman (Sleeping Habibi) (2008). Additionally, he has participated in several European film festivals, where he received a range of awards as an actor and producer. Since 2016, he has acted in several English-speaking roles, such as Tyrant on FX, History Channel's Vikings, and the BBC's TV mini-series The Last Post, and announced to appear in the upcoming Netflix Show Messiah 2019. In a film festival in 2016 that celebrated Arab film submissions to the Oscars, he was noted as being the most submitted actor in Arabic films submissions to the Academy Award for Best Foreign Language Film (The Oscars). He is often tagged in western media as "Egypt's Brad Pitt", and he has also been described as "the next Omar Sharif" especially after his American debut movie Civic Duty in 2007. Chosen as a Goodwill Ambassador for UNICEF in 2007, Naga played a pivotal role in child rights awareness, as well as the very first HIV awareness campaigns in Egypt and the Arab world, and participated in several international causes, including advocating for democracy in his home country Egypt. He is one of the most recognizable celebrity faces of the 2011 Egyptian Revolution, taking part in mass demonstrations in Cairo that led to the removal of President Mubarak. He faced defamation campaigns against him by the state-owned media during the Mubarak era before the January 25th, 2011 revolution in Egypt, and several times again from the 2013 "coup d'etat" General Sisi government in Egypt in retaliation for his advocacy about the deterioration of human rights situation in Egypt.

He has also been successful across many Arab TV networks as a host for prime-time shows from 1997 until 2005.

Early years 
Naga was born in Heliopolis, a cosmopolitan neighborhood of Cairo, Egypt. His father, the late Egyptian army major General Mohamed-Sami Aboul-Naga, came from a traditional family of major landowners in ad-Daqahliyah, Aga, Egypt that was mostly confiscated during the Nasser revolution of 1952 and its Land reform in Egypt. His mother revealed in 2013 that he is a descendant of the Islamic prophet Muhammad through Fatima Az-Zahraa and Imam Husayn ibn Ali son of Ali ibn Abi Talib. He is the younger brother of American-based Egyptian architect Tarek Naga, and architect Seif Abol Naga, who appeared in the classic film Empire M.

During his childhood, Khaled Abol Naga spent much time with his elder brother Tarek, who lives in the US, whom he has said served as a major influence on his character growing up. Khaled was naturally interested in acting at an early age and appeared in a film (Madness of Love) starring Naglaa Fathi. He attended St. George's College school for his primary education, graduated as an engineer of electrical telecommunications from the renowned Ain Shams University Faculty of Engineering (ASUFE) and American University in Cairo. He studied Computer Science with a minor in Theater and Drama. He played water polo for his varsity team while based in Europe (1986–9), worked part-time as a fashion model (1993–6), and was a late-night talk show host and radio presenter in the late 1990s.

He joined the theatre department at The American University in Cairo, where he had the opportunity to discover his acting talent in the University's drama productions. In 1997 he left to the United States for more independent studies of his passion, filmmaking. There he studied film acting, cinematography and directing. He cited his acting teacher Dr Mahmoud Al Lozy as his mentor who has influenced him the most.

Acting career 
The first phase of Naga's acting career (1989–2002) was largely on stage (in the theatre), although he began hosting TV talk shows in 1998, which contributed to his popularity as a media personality in Egypt and Arabic speaking states. His television and film work has included a variety of different genres. After co-producing and acting in 2009 independent film Heliopolis by first time director Ahmad Abdalla, he starred in a second film Microphone which he also co-produced with Mohamed Hefzy in 2010. From 2010 onwards Abol Naga mostly played the lead of much more diverse and complex roles, continued to win numerous awards as an actor and as a producer from regional and international prestigious film festivals. appointed as a jury member and sometimes jury head of regional and international film festivals. he is considered one of the top actors in the world today out of the Arab region.

Film 
Naga's acting career began in 1977 when he was still a child with a part in Egyptian film Madness of Love (Arabic: جنون الحب) (aka: Genoun El Hob) (aka: La Folie De L'amore). Since then he has appeared in a variety of films including psychological thrillers, romances and musical comedies.

In 2001 his film career gained momentum when he was chosen by director Daoud Abdel Sayed for the lead in A Citizen, An Informant And A Thief  (Mowaten we Mokhber we Haramy) (Arabic: مواطن و مخبر و حرامي). In 2002 he demonstrated his talent for singing in the musical comedy Wust El-Balad ("Downtown"). He was then offered a part in  "Sleepless Nights" (aka: "Sahar El Layali") which became a box office hit in 2003–2004. Later in the same year Abol Naga was awarded Best Actor at the Damascus International Film Festival and the Best Actor Award from the Paris Arab Cinema Biennale of the Institute du Monde Arabe IMA Film Festival.

After "Sleepless Nights" aka: Sahar El Layali, Abol Naga acted in more films in a short period of time. In 2004 he played naval officer Lt Hasan Hosny in Yom El Karama (Dignity Day), followed by his character Kimo in a popular romantic comedy Hob El Banat (Girl's Love). In 2005–2006 he appeared in several more films: Harb Italia (Italian War), Malek wa Ketaba (Heads and Tails), and the romantic comedy Banat West El Balad (Downtown Girls).

In 2006 he appeared as the lead in Leabet el hob (The Game of Love) – for which he received Best Actor at the Alexandra International Film Festival. He also appeared in Tamer El-Bustani's independent short film: Qutat Baladi (Stray Cats). In the same year he was introduced to English speaking audiences in the role of Gabe Hassan in the American/Canadian production Civic Duty, It premiered at Tribecca film Festival in New york, and nominated at the Cairo International Film Festival 2007, his performance created a lot of attention to his talent and since then was often described by media as the next Omar Sharif.

In a review of In the Heliopolis Flat, Mohamed El-Assyouti of Al-Ahram Weekly noted a tendency for Abol Naga "to have been type-cast as the middle-class romantic star co-lead in almost all his films this year". His subsequent portrayal of Farid in the crime mystery Kashf Hesab gained him more positive critical attention. In the same year, Abol Naga played the lead Ez in the action/thriller/drama Agamista. In 2008 he portrayed Ramez in the comedy Habibi Naeman. In 2009 he appeared as a lead Cherif in One-Zero and then produced and appeared as the lead in first time director Ahmad Abdalla's Heliopolis as Ibrahim. In 2010 he continued the working relationship by starring in and co-producing Abdalla's second film: Microphone. Originally due for mainstream release in Cairo on January 26, 2011, the film was re-released after the protests in Tahrir Square and won numerous awards and gained a regional and worldwide acclaim.

Naga has a record of presence at International Film Festivals, either as a performer or a jury member. In 2009–2010 attended 12 international film festivals including the Venice Film Festival, Toronto's TIFF, Vancouver's VIFF, Cairo's CIFF, Abu Dhabi's ADIFF, Doha Tribeca Film Festival, London's BFI, and Thessaloniki FF, inviting him either as a jury member or as an actor in his award-winning movies "Microphone", "One-Zero" or "Heliopolis".

In an interview in 2010 Abol Naga said "From the industry side, my biggest challenge is to find original roles".

Naga achieved a historical winning of all important Best Actor Awards offered in Egypt in 2014(Egypt's National Film Festival, Film Society Festival for Egyptian Cinema, The Catholic Centre festival for Egyptian Cinema) for his role in "Villa 69" as well as winning The Best Actor award (SILVER PYRAMID) from The prestigious Cairo International Film Festival for his role in the Palestinian submission to the OSCAR's "Eyes of a thief" among other regional Best Actor awards, in the same year, he also won several regional awards for his incredible portrayal of an older man Hussein in "Villa 69" including the Best Actor Award from Festival du Cinema Africain Khouribga, Morocco (Khaled is the Lead Actor & Executive-Producer)

Theatre 
Naga's theatre work started in 1989 with his university plays at The Department of Theatre, Drama and Music of the American university in Cairo, his work as a theatrical actor included a variety of roles; in some instances like Mahfouz-yat (1990) and Two Underground (1994) he has played more than one role in a single production, in the production of Lionel Bart's musical Oliver!, he played Bill Sikes as well as worked as an Assistant Director to Walter Eyesslinck, He collected few awards as an actor and director of varsity plays.

In 2010 he became involved as filming director of the student play production of The BuSSy monologues – "True stories about young men and women in Egypt".

On Saturday 13 April 2013, the play written by Nassim Soleimanpour, White Rabbit Red Rabbit that was performed by an array of A-list actors around the world, was performed for the first time in Arabic in Cairo by Naga, who knew nothing of the play before he stood on the stage, as it is an experimental play;  "This was a role for which I was prepared the most; you are always instructed not to do any preparation for the role [before reading the script]," said Abol Naga. The actor then revealed what intrigued him most about the play: "I liked that the meaning of the play is buried within the script, and I was unveiling it [as I read] with you. Sometimes I repeated the statements I thought were important," explained Abol Naga.

In September 2013, in a unique stage play reading in Arabic; Cancelled, Khaled Abol Naga seamlessly takes on the lead role of Hassan, the director, and does a perfect and utterly hilarious impersonation of the talented, kind hearted and easily irritated director-professor who loves his students, but constantly criticizes them and the entire generation to which they belong, In this rough form of a play Abol Naga's theatrical capabilities shined.

In September 2015, a unique musical opened at The Royal Cultural Centre of Amman, Jordan, He directed the first ever Arabic transportation of the acclaimed West End musical Oliver! by Lionel Bart. His unique and original adaptation swaps Dickensian London to a contemporary Arab city (Amman in the Jordan production). He created together with the well known Disney writer Zeinab Mobarak an adaptation that smartly kept the original Charles Dickens spirit and transported all the original songs and lyrics to the contemporary Arab culture. Maestro Nayer Nagui conducted the orchestra and coached the children singing marathon lessons which was held in Jordan mostly with Syrian refugee children.

Television 
As a TV host, Abol Naga from 1999, was offered several opportunities to host different television programs at the variety channel of the Nile TV Network of ERTU. In 2000 he was awarded Best New TV Announcer (Egypt). He was later chosen to host the popular Good Morning Egypt TV show of ERTU, which he presented until 2001. He hosted a popular live talk show Eshar Ma'ana (translates: Spend the night with us). After leaving Nile Variety channel in 2000, he hosted Muzikana TV show about the Arab music top charts for MBC TV which brought him recognition across Arabic speaking states.

As an actor on TV, he first appeared and attracted attention to his talent in his award-winning (Seif el Daly), a male lead role in the Egyptian TV mini-series El Banat in 2003, then after his cinematic box office hit Sahar El-Layaly as the lead (Omar) in Leila's Mad Man, aka: Magnoon Laila (Arabic: مجنون ليلي), a very successful  TV mini-series in 2007 broadcast all over the Arab region and won him several awards later.

In 2016, he focused on the English speaking markets as he appeared in an American Fox TV production (Tyrant season 3) in a main role of an Islamic cleric sheik Al-Qadi – (a recurring guest star in 10/10 episodes), then he had a celebrated guest-star appearance as the Emir of Kairouan: Ziyadat-Allah – (a guest star role in 2 episodes) on the History channel hit TV show Vikings (season 5) airing in Canada in 2017, as well as a BBC TV mini-series in a guest recurring role, The Informant – (in 6/6 episodes) of The Last Post (TV mini-series). He is announced to appear on Messiah, a new Netflix episodic TV series in 2020.

Radio 
As a presenter, Abol Naga created and hosted BBCe!, a weekly bilingual radio program in Arabic and English. This is a co-production with the BBC World Service and airs on several ERTU radio stations within Egypt. BBCe was short listed for the BBC World Service Innovation Award in January 2007.

As an actor, Naga has performed in several ERTU radio productions (Ramadan seasons) as a voice actor. In 2003 he played a main role among an all star cast as Sherif in Ahlam El Sabaya (translates: The Girl's Dreams) directed by Hosny Ghoneim. The following year he performed in the romantic comedy radio drama Back to Love (directed by Hessein Ibrahim) (2004) as the lead Tarek.

Humanitarian work 
Naga has used his status as a film star in the Arab region and even before as a TV celebrity to raise awareness for a variety of issues in Egypt and the Middle East. He played a pivotal role among others in the pro-democracy movement that culminated in the Tahrir square Egyptian revolution of January 25, 2011. He organized events and concerts in support of religious tolerance. He advocated strongly to support Egyptian minorities as in the case of the violence against the copts. He was also one of the very early voices that supported taboo subjects in Egypt and the region like HIV awareness and FGM horrific practices.

In 2005 Naga joined the Make Poverty History campaign.

He was appointed a UNICEF Goodwill Ambassador in 2007. On April 21, 2008 the UNICEF partnership was renewed. Throughout his involvement, Abol Naga has addressed several taboo issues affecting children in Egypt, including HIV/AIDS, female genital mutilation (FGM), children's rights, street children, and adolescents’ development.

In 2009 he celebrated Egypt's Orphan's Day (April 3) with children participating in Doodle4Google, an art event that encouraged orphaned children to create variants of the Google logo to reflect their Egyptian identity at the German University in Cairo.

He is a strong supporter (and directed the 2010 filmed version) of the play: The BuSSy monologues, It originated as a student story telling play in 2005. It was inspired by Eve Ensler's Vagina Monologues. The play was constructed of hundreds of acts based on real letters of true but taboo stories of young women and men from Egypt. It culminated in a show in 2010 that covered controversial gender topics affecting youth in Egypt and was struggling to find any theatre in Cairo to accept its production, hence the idea of filming it to document the play in a filmed version. Abol Naga directed and produced with others a filmed version in 2010 after being invited by the students to watch it in the parking lot of the Cairo Opera house!.

He also was an ambassador for Y-Peer: An international youth network concerned with informing and empowering youth on issues such as sexuality and reproductive health that was begun by United Nations Population Fund (UNFPA).
 
He has supported the Hands Across the Middle East Support Alliance (HAMSA), a non-profit, non-sectarian Human Rights organisation by acting as a celebrity judge for the "Dream Deferred Essay Contest".

In 2010 he supported Crisis Action's Sudan365 campaign which was launched in January that year to promote peace in Sudan at its Cairo event.

At a special launch of The State of the World's Children by UNICEF Egypt in April 2010, Abol Naga identified his priorities as: "an Egypt free of female genital mutilation, an Egypt where clean water and proper sewage systems were available nationwide, an Egypt where there was equality between all children, regardless of their religion or gender, and an Egypt where there was equality in education and where children were protected from the effects of climate change."

He participated in the first TEDx Cairo in May the same year at the American University.

In the wake of the January 1, 2011 Alexandria bombing, Abol Naga visited the victims and survivors in hospitals, and lead candle lit vigils denouncing violence against copts and to promote religious tolerance in Egypt. On January 10 he organised and hosted the "Microphone for Alexandria" concert with musicians who had appeared in Microphone (2010). The concert aimed to raise funds for the victims and promote solidarity between Christian and Muslim Egyptians.

In late January 2011, he participated in the Egyptian Revolution in Tahrir Square, having been a signatory to Mohamed ElBaradei's manifesto for political reform, Together for Change on March 28, 2010 with other film makers and directors. While in Tahrir, he took live footage, photographs and recorded audio casts which were later uploaded to the internet. He was interviewed several times in English, once by Ayman Mohyeldin of Al Jazeera, and several times by the BBC regarding the protests. Al-Ahram Weekly later reported that he was involved in an altercation with plain clothes police in which he was assaulted and then deleted the news! He reported that he has an ongoing lifetime project working on collating his footage and photographs of the uprising in Tahrir Square 2011, documenting the massive protests against president Mohamed Morsi of the Muslim Brotherhood in November 2012, the military coup in 2013 and ongoing.

Goodwill Ambassador for UNICEF Egypt (2007–2015) 
Outline of his social work:
 2015: – Out to the Sea – Droses – Alexandria Bibliotheca, Plastic is not Fantastic Awareness event and campaign
 2014: – UNICEF Child Rights campaign CRC 25
 2013: – UNICEF Assiut Clean water pipes connection project  – UNICEF MAZA LAW campaign
 2012: – UNICEF social media launch, – UN girl day celebration and meetings against FGM Early Marriage
 2011: – UNICEF Universities Film Festival 2011
 2010: – UNAIDS regional top level policy making meeting Dubai 2010
 2010: – Clean Water campaign, Child Rights Campaign, Orphans day pyramids event, AIDS/HIV awareness TV spots, Children Film Festival Creativity seminar, and workshop for 1 minute short films by children.
 2009: – Child Rights campaign CRC 2009
 2008: – Gaza border visit of the wounded Palestinian kids – HIV awareness campaigns with UNAIDS and UNICEF – Anti Khetan FGM campaigns
 2007: April: Appointed UNICEF National Goodwill Ambassador. March: Visit to HIV-related projects in Alexandria. February 2007: Participated in seminar on the media and HIV/AIDS at the Cairo Children's Film Festival. January 2007: Participated in seminar and Youth awareness workshop event about National Egyptian HIV/AIDS campaign at Ismailia, Suez
 2006: November 2006: Participated in launch of Unite for Children, Unite against AIDS & Hepatitis C Campaign Awards

Awards 
Naga has won a multitude of awards as an actor specially in the years 2004 for Sleepless Nights, and 2014 for Villa 69 and Eyes of a Thief. and as a producer in 2013–2014 for Villa 69 and in 2010–2011 for Microphone, a film that is considered a classic and one of the few independent films that is listed as one of the 100 greatest films in the history of Arab cinema.

Awards as an actor, producer, director

Jury appointments 
Khaled Abol Naga has been appointed as a jury member or head of jury in numerous local or international film festivals since 2008, here are some of his appointments:

Filmography

Television 
 2020: MESSIAH (season 1) : NETFLIX TV series – airing 1 Jan 2020  YACOB – (Guest star role in 3/10 episodes)
 2019: THE LAST POST (season 1) : BBC TV mini series – airing in UK 2018  The Informant – (Guest star role in 6/6 episodes)
 2017: VIKINGS (season 5) : History Channel TV show – airing in Canada Feb.2017  Ziyadat-Allah – (Guest star role in 2 episodes)
 2016: TYRANT (season 3) : FX Networks TV show – USA Sept.2016  AL-Qadi – (Guest star main role in 10/10 episodes)
 2007: LEILA's MAD MAN aka: Magnoon Laila : TV mini series – Egypt 2007  Omar – (Lead Series Regular role in 15/15 Episodes)   WON several local Popular Voting Best Actor Awards
 2003: EL BANAT : TV mini series – Egypt 2003  Seif – (Lead Series Regular role in 30/30 Episodes) Won Best Actor Award at 2003 Catholic center Film Festival

Shorts and documentaries 
 2017: The Unknown Sweet Potato Seller (Short) Director: Ahmed Roshdy - (Khaled Acted & co-produced) 
 2016: Nasser's Republic, The Making of Modern Egypt (Doccu.) Director: Michal Goldman (Khaled played Nasser’s Voice-Over ) CIFF 2016, 
 2015: Camera Obscura (Short) Director: Nour Zaki - (Khaled : Actor & co-producer) World Premiere in 1 minute shorts at The Oscars 2015

Feature films 
MISS FISHER AND THE CRYPT OF TEARS (2020): Australian TV Feature Film- release Feb. 2020 - (Main character)
Out of The Ordinary (2015)  [Egypt]  Director: Daoud Abdel Sayed - Dr.Yehya – Lead character - Nominated for Best Actor in: Abu Dhabi Film Festival 2015
 Eyes Of A Thief (2014) [Palestine] Director: Najwa Najjar – Tarek Khedr - The Lead character - Palestine’s nomination to the Oscars 2014 - Won Best Actor Award : Cairo International Film Festival 2014 - Several other nominations, ...
 From A to B (2014) [UAE]  Director: Ali Mustafa - Syrian Officer – Guest star role - Nominated in: Abu Dhabi Film Festival 2014, Cairo Int’l Film Festival 2014
 Decor (2014) [Egypt] Director: Ahmad Abdalla - Cherif - Male co-Lead character - London BFI Film Festival 2014 - Cairo Int’l Film Festival 2014
 Villa 69 (2013) [Egypt] Director: Ayten Amin – Hussein- Lead Character and Executive Producer – WON Best Actor Award – National Film Festival for Egyptian Cinema 2014 – Won Best Actor Award – Khoribga African Film Festival 2014 – WON Best Actor Award – Cathothoc Center Film Festival for Egyptian Cinema 2014 – WON Best Actor Award – Egypt’s 40th Film Society Film Festival 2014 – Won Best Actor Award – several other
 Bussy Monologues (2013) [Egypt] - Director & Producer of the Filmed Monologues, http://www.Bussy.TV
 Microphone (2010) [Egypt]  Director: Ahmad Abdalla – Khaled – Main character & co-producer - WON Tunis Chartage Gold Tanit Best Film Award 2010, Won Cairo Int’l Film Festival Best Arabic Film Award 2010, Won Dubai Film Festival Best Editing Award 2010, Won Istanbul Film Festival Gold Tulip Best Film Award 2011 Toronto Film Festival 2010, Vancouver FF 2010, Dubai Film Festival 2010, London BFI 2010, several other festivals
 Heliopolis (2009) [Egypt] Director: Ahmad Abdalla - Actor & Co-producer - WON Special mention CIFF 2009, Palm Springs IFF 2009, Toronto Film Festival 2009, Vancouver FF 2009, MEIFF Abu-Dhabi 2009, Thessaloniki FF 2009, Marrakech IFF 2009, Stockholm FF 2009,  several other festivals
 One-Zero (2009) [Egypt] Director: Kamla Abu Zekry - Cherif - Main character in ensemble cast  - Nominated at Venice Film Festival 2009 Official New Horizon Competition - WON Brussels Film Festival 2009 Best Scenario & Jury special prize, Won 42 awards from several International and local Festivals
 Habibi Naeman (Sleeping Habibi) (2008) [Egypt] - Ramez – The Male Lead 
 Agamista (2007) [Egypt] Director: Tarek Abdel Moaty –  Co-Lead role
 In The Heliopolis Flat (2007) aka: Fi Shaket Masr El Gedida [Egypt] Director: Mohamed Khan  – Yehya – The Male Lead  - Won awards from several International and local Festivals 
 Civic Duty (2007) [US/Canadian] Director: Jeff Renfroe – Gabe – co-Lead with Peter Krause - Nominated at Tribeca Film Festival 2007
 Kashf Hesab (2007) [Egypt] Director: Amir Ramsis – Farid – The Lead 
 None but that! (2007) aka: Mafeesh Gher Keda!  [Egypt] (Musical) Director: Khaled El Hagar  – Male co-Lead 
 A Game of Love (2006) [Egypt] Director: Mohamed Ali aka: Leabet El Hob – The Male Lead  - WON Best Actor Award – Alexandria Int’l film festival 2006 
 Harb Atalia (2005) [Egypt] Director: Ahmed Saleh - Fouad -Male co-Lead  (Language:Italian & Arabic)
 Downtown Girls (2005) aka: Banat Wust El Balad [Egypt] Director: Mohamed Khan  – Chef Samir – Main Supporting role
 Malek We Ketaba (2005) [Egypt] Director: Kamla Abu Zekry – Tarek – Main supporting role –  Won several Best Film Awards
 Hob El Banat (2004) aka: Girl’s Love  [Egypt] Director: Khaled El Hagar – Karim el sharkawy – Male co-Lead role- WON Special Mention at Cairo Int’l Film Festival 2004
 Yom El Karama aka: Dignity Day (2004) [Egypt] Director: Ali Abdel Khalek – Lt.N.Hassan Hosny – co-Lead role 
 Sleepless Nights  aka: Sahar El Layaly (2003) [Egypt] Director: Hani Khalifa - Ali –  co-Lead male role (shared with 3 other) - Won Best Acting Award for the ensemble cast at The Institué Du Monde Arabe Film Festival 2003, Won Best Acting Award at Damascus Film Festival 2003, Won awards from several International and local Festivals
 Mowaten we Mokhber we Haramy (2001) aka: A citizen, a detective & a thief  [Egypt] Director: Daoud Abdel Sayed – The citizen Selim – The male Lead –  WON several Best Film Awards 
 Rendez Vous (2000) [Egypt] Director: Ali Abdel Khalek – Ashraf – Male co-lead shared with 2 others

References

Further reading 
Isis Nusair (September 13, 2018). "The Art of the Political: An Interview with Egyptian Actor, Director, and Producer Khaled Abol Naga [aka Kal Naga]." Jadaliyya. http://www.jadaliyya.com/Details/37936/

Photos: https://commons.wikimedia.org/wiki/File:Sheik_Al-Qadi_-_Press_Portrait_2_copy_small.jpg

External links 

 

Living people
Male actors from Cairo
Egyptian male film actors
UNICEF Goodwill Ambassadors
Ain Shams University alumni
Egyptian male stage actors
Egyptian male television actors
Egyptian film directors
Egyptian film producers
St. George's College, Cairo alumni
1975 births